Félix Oukiné Tcheoude (born 26 December 1999) is a Cameroonian footballer who plays as a midfielder for Coton Sport and the Cameroon national team.

Club career
While serving as team captain in 2020–21, Oukiné led Coton Sport to the group stage of the CAF Confederation Cup for the first time in seven years. He scored one goal in the competition, contributing the deciding goal in the away leg of their 2–0 first round win over Zambian champions Green Eagles on 23 December 2020.

International career
Oukiné was called up to the Cameroon national team by manager Martin Ndtoungou in January 2021 as a part of his 33-man squad for the pandemic-delayed 2020 African Nations Championship on home soil. He made his debut in the opening match against Zimbabwe on 16 January, playing the full 90 minutes of their 1–0 win. After appearing in all three group matches, he scored his maiden international goal in their quarterfinal matchup against DR Congo, securing the 2–1 comeback victory and a spot in the next round. Cameroon was eliminated by eventual champions Morocco in the semi-finals before losing to Guinea in the third-place playoff. Oukiné's performance in the tournament drew the interest of several French teams.

Career statistics

International

International goals
Scores and results list Rwanda's goal tally first.

References

External links
 
 

Living people
1999 births
Cameroonian footballers
Cameroon international footballers
Association football midfielders
Coton Sport FC de Garoua players
Elite One players
2020 African Nations Championship players
Cameroon A' international footballers